Monte Hermoso is a town located on the Atlantic coast of Argentina, some  east of the city of Bahía Blanca, in the south of the Province of Buenos Aires. It is the administrative seat of the partido of Monte Hermoso.

The summer climate of Monte Hermoso is more temperate than that of other major seaside resorts due to the sea breeze effect, while the water itself is warmer, making for a pleasant beach experience.

Monte Hermoso owes its existence to the 1879 purchase of 4,000 seaside hectares (10,000 acres) by Esteban Dufaur. His son, Sulpicio, created the El Recreo estancia in 1910, and in 1918, began welcoming guests with the inaugural of the Hotel de Madera; the hotel was built by Dafaur with lumber salvaged from a shipwreck on the shore. The settlement was established as such in 1975, and given autonomy on April 1, 1979.

Prefabricated in France by the same construction company, Barbier Bernad and Turenne that built the Eiffel Tower in Paris, it was erected in Argentina under the direction of Engineer Luigi, who also supervised the construction of the nearby naval base at Puerto Belgrano. Opened on 1 January 1906, the staffed lighthouse, painted in red and white and giving out a white flash every 9 seconds, comprises an octagonal pyramidal cast iron tower with a central cylinder lantern and gallery. Guided tours of the lighthouse are provided daily.

References

External links

Official site
Informative site
Maps and information
News (Spanish)
Tourism (Spanish)
Informative and commercial site
Recalada Lighthouse (English)
Faro Recalada (Spanish)

Populated places in Buenos Aires Province
Populated coastal places in Argentina
Seaside resorts in Argentina 
Populated places established in 1975